Copper(I) sulfate, also known as cuprous sulfate, is an inorganic compound with the chemical formula Cu2SO4. It is a white solid, in contrast to copper(II) sulfate, which is blue in hydrous form. It is an unusual example of a copper(I) compound derived from an oxyanion, illustrated also by the non- or fleeting existence of cuprous nitrate and cuprous perchlorate.

Structure 
Cu2SO4 crystallizes in the orthorhombic space group Fddd. Each oxygen in a sulfate anion is bridged to another sulfate by a copper atom, and the Cu-O distances are 196 pm.

Synthesis 
Cuprous sulfate is produced by the reaction of copper metal with sulfuric acid at 200 °C:

2Cu + 2 H2SO4 -> Cu2SO4 + SO2  +  2 H2O

Cu2SO4 can also be synthesized by the action of dimethyl sulfate on cuprous oxide:

Cu2O + (CH3O)2SO2 -> Cu2SO4 + (CH3)2O

The material is stable in dry air at room temperature but decomposes rapidly in presence of moisture or upon heating. It decomposes into copper(II) sulfate pentahydrate upon contact with water.

Cu2SO4 +  5 H2O  -> Cu + CuSO4*5(H2O)

It can also be produced by the reaction of copper(II) sulfate and a reducing agent such as sodium thiosulfate.

References 

Copper(I) compounds
Sulfates